Henry County is a county located in east central Indiana, United States. As of 2020, the population was 48,914. The county seat and largest and only city is New Castle. Henry County is the main setting of the novel Raintree County by Ross Lockridge Jr.

History
Henry County was formed in 1822 from the Delaware New Purchase resulting from the Treaty of St. Mary's in 1818. It was named for Patriot Patrick Henry, governor of Virginia.

Geography

Cities
 New Castle

Towns

Unincorporated areas

Townships

Reservoirs
 Castle Lake
 Giboney Lake
 Haven, Lake
 Summit Lake Reservoir
 Westwood Park Reservoir

Adjacent counties
 Delaware County (north)
 Randolph County (northeast)
 Wayne County (east)
 Fayette County (southeast)
 Rush County (south)
 Hancock County (southwest)
 Madison County (northwest)

Major highways
Sources:  National Atlas, U.S. Census Bureau
 Interstate 70
 U.S. Route 35
 U.S. Route 36
 U.S. Route 40
 State Road 3
 State Road 38
 State Road 103
 State Road 109
 State Road 140
 State Road 234
 State Road 236

Climate and weather 

Government

The county government is a constitutional body, and is granted specific powers by the Constitution of Indiana, and by the Indiana Code.

County Council: The county council is the legislative branch of the county government and controls all the spending and revenue collection in the county. Representatives are elected from county districts. The council members serve four-year terms. They are responsible for setting salaries, the annual budget, and special spending. The council also has limited authority to impose local taxes, in the form of an income and property tax that is subject to state level approval, excise taxes, and service taxes.

County Commissioners: The executive body of the county is made of a board of commissioners. The commissioners are elected county-wide, in staggered terms, and each serves a four-year term. One of the commissioners, typically the most senior, serves as president. The commissioners are charged with executing the acts legislated by the council, collecting revenue, and managing the day-to-day functions of the county government.

County Courts: The county maintains three courts. Circuit Court I, Circuit Court II and Circuit Court III . The judge on the court is elected to a term of four years and must be a member of the Indiana Bar Association. In some cases, court decisions can be appealed to the state level circuit court.

County Officials: The county has several other elected offices, including sheriff, coroner, auditor, treasurer, recorder, surveyor, and circuit court clerk Each of these elected officers serves a term of four years and oversees a different part of county government. Members elected to county government positions are required to declare party affiliations and to be residents of the county.

Henry County is part of Indiana's 6th congressional district; Indiana Senate district 28; and Indiana House of Representatives districts 54 and 56.

Demographics

2020 Census
As of the census of 2020,  there were 48,914 people, 18,387 households, and 9,489 families living in the town. The racial makeup of the county was 93.8% White, 2.2% African American, 1.1% Asian, 0.02% Native Hawaiian or Pacific Islander, 0.2% Native American or Alaska Native, 0.8% from other races, and 3.4% from two or more races. Hispanic or Latino of any race were 0.2% of the population.

There were 18,387 households, of which 20.7% had children under the age of 18 living with them, 49.7% were married couples living together, 25.4% had a female householder with no husband present, 17.3% had a male householder with no wife present, and 7.6% were non-families. 42.7% of all households were made up of individuals. The average household size was 2.66 and the average family size was 2.96.

26.8% of the population had never been married. 48.0% of residents were married and not separated, 7.0% were widowed, 16.4% were divorced, and 1.8% were separated.

The median age in the town was 42.0. 5.0% of residents were under the age of 5; 20.7% of residents were under the age of 18; 79.3% were age 18 or older; and 18.9% were age 65 or older. 9.5% of the population were veterans.

The most common language spoken at home was English with 98.5% speaking it at home, 1.0% spoke Spanish at home, 0.2% spoke other Indo-European languages, 0.2% spoke an Asian or Pacific Islander language at home, and 0.1% spoke other languages. 0.5% of the population were foreign born.

The median household income in Henry County was $51,104, 9.0% less than the median average for the state of Indiana. 13.9% of the population were in poverty, including 19.3% of residents under the age of 18. The poverty rate for the town was 1% higher than that of the state. 18.5% of the population were disabled and 6.8% had no healthcare coverage. 43.8% of the population had attained a high school or equivalent degree, 21.1% had attended college but received no degree, 9.0% had attained an Associate's degree or higher, 10.7% had attained a Bachelor's degree or higher, and 5.6% had a graduate or professional degree. 9.8% had no degree. 50.7% of Henry County residents were employed, working a mean of 40.0 hours per week.

2010 Census
As of the 2010 United States Census, there were 49,462 people, 19,077 households, and 13,020 families residing in the county. The racial makeup of the county was 95.7% white, 2.2% black or African American, 0.3% Asian, 0.1% American Indian, 0.4% from other races, and 1.2% from two or more races. Those of Hispanic or Latino origin made up 1.4% of the population. In terms of ancestry, 19.9% were German, 13.3% were American, 11.8% were Irish, and 9.1% were English.

Of the 19,077 households, 31.2% had children under the age of 18 living with them, 52.1% were married couples living together, 11.6% had a female householder with no husband present, 31.8% were non-families, and 27.3% of all households were made up of individuals. The average household size was 2.43 and the average family size was 2.94. The median age was 41.4 years.

The median income for a household in the county was $47,697 and the median income for a family was $52,701. Males had a median income of $42,628 versus $30,226 for females. The per capita income for the county was $19,879. About 10.2% of families and 13.7% of the population were below the poverty line, including 20.0% of those under age 18 and 8.8% of those age 65 or over.

Recreation 
 Summit Lake State Park
 Westwood Park

Notable people 
 Omar Bundy, Major General, World War One
 William Grose, Major General, Civil War
 Robert Indiana, artist
 Arthur C. Mellette, first Governor of South Dakota
 Wilbur Wright, aviation pioneer
 Steve Alford, NCAA basketball coach and former player
 Kent Benson, Former NCAA and NBA basketball player
 Ira Hough, Medal of Honor recipient, 1864
 Clessie Cummins, inventor
Edward Black (soldier), Civil War
Solomon Meredith, Major General, Civil War
Thomas J. Graves, Medal of Honor recipient 
William Zion, Medal of Honor recipient
 Edward E. Moore, Indiana state senator and Los Angeles City Council member

See also
 National Register of Historic Places listings in Henry County, Indiana

References

External links
 New Castle Henry County Chamber of Commerce
 Henry County Convention & Visitors Bureau
 Henry County Government Site
 Henry County collection, Rare Books and Manuscripts, Indiana State Library

 
Indiana counties
1822 establishments in Indiana
Populated places established in 1822